General Sir Malcolm Henry Stanley Grover  (19 July 1858 – 16 November 1945) was a general in the British Indian Army.

He was promoted to lieutenant-colonel on 11 September 1902.

He was a commander of 4th (Quetta) Division during World War I.

He married Helen Grace Lawrence, granddaughter of Sir George St Patrick Lawrence. Their son was Major General John Grover.

References

British Indian Army generals
Companions of the Order of the Bath
Knights Commander of the Order of the Indian Empire
1858 births
1945 deaths
Indian Army generals of World War I